The following are the national records in Olympic weightlifting in Nigeria. Records are maintained in each weight class for the snatch lift, clean and jerk lift, and the total for both lifts by the Nigeria Weightlifting Federation.

Current records

Men

Women

Historical records

Men (1998–2018)

Women (1998–2018)

References

External links

Nigeria
records
Olympic weightlifting
weightlifting